The Best American Mystery Stories 1997, a volume in The Best American Mystery Stories series, was edited by guest editor Robert B. Parker with Otto Penzler. The series editor chooses about fifty article candidates, from which the guest editor picks 20 or so for publication; the remaining runner-up articles listed in the appendix.

Mystery Stories included

Distinguished Mystery Stories of 1996 - listed in appendix

See also
The Best American Mystery Stories
The Best American Mystery Stories 1997
The Best American Mystery Stories 1998
The Best American Mystery Stories 2009
The Best American Mystery Stories 2013
The Best American Mystery Stories 2014
The Best American Mystery Stories 2015

References

Mystery